Hanbury is a civil parish in the district of East Staffordshire, Staffordshire, England.  It contains 20 buildings that are recorded in the National Heritage List for England.  Of these, one is listed at Grade II*, the middle grade, and the others are at Grade II, the lowest grade.  The listed buildings in the parish are houses, including a former manor house and a small country house, cottages, farmhouses and farm buildings, a church and its lych gate, a school, and four mileposts.  


Key

Buildings

References

Citations

Sources

Lists of listed buildings in Staffordshire